Tilo Prückner (26 October 1940 – 2 July 2020) was a German television and film actor. His career spanned five decades and more than 100 films.

Early life

Tilo Prückner was born in Augsburg, the son of the paediatrician Alfred Prückner and his wife Dorothea née Krause in Augsburg. The Prückner family has a long reaching family tradition in Hof. He first went to the St. Anna-Gymnasium in Augsburg and changed then to the school Melanchthon-Gymnasium in Nürnberg, where he passed his Abitur in 1960. He dropped his study of the law to begin an actor's education in Munich with Hans Josef Becher and Ellen Mahlke.

Career
From 1962 until 1964 he was employed at the Schauburg in Munich, and afterwards worked at the Theater St. Gallen, from 1966 to 1968 at the Theater Oberhausen and 1968/1969 at the Schauspielhaus Zürich. From 1970 to 1973, he played at Berlin's Schaubühne, where he was one of the founding members. Since 1973 he worked as a freelance actor at the Bayerisches Staatsschauspiel in Munich.

After his participation in the TV-recordings of productions at the Schaubühne his work with directors of the New German Cinema increased, including Bernhard Sinkel, Edgar Reitz and Peter Fleischmann. He often played sick or handicapped people. Among his more recognized roles with international audiences are the bat-riding "Night Hob" in the 1984 fantasy film The NeverEnding Story and the scientist Dr. Richter in the 2012 science fiction comedy Iron Sky.

In later years Prückner proved his art of interpreting diverse characters in a great number of movie and TV productions, often portraying cranky or eccentric characters. He appeared as the hypochondriac detective Gernot Schubert in the TV-series Adelheid und ihre Mörder for six years, co-starring with Evelyn Hamann and Heinz Baumann. Since 2003, he had a regular supporting role in the TV-series Kommissarin Lucas as the landlord of the main character played by Ulrike Kriener. From 2015 until his death, he played a lead role in the ARD crime series Rentnercops about retired cops who are hired back into their jobs.

In 2013, he published his first novel, Willi Merkatz wird verlassen.

Death
On 2 July 2020 Prückner died of a sudden heart failure in Berlin at the age of 79.

Selected filmography

  (1967, dir. Franz-Josef Spieker) as Stiglitz
 Apokal (1971, dir. Paul Anczykowski) as Miles
  (1974, dir. Reinhard Hauff) as Zick Zack
 One or the Other of Us (1974, dir. Wolfgang Petersen) as Drögnitz
 Schoolmaster Hofer (1975, dir. Peter Lilienthal) as Custodian
  (1975, dir. Volker Vogeler) as Crazy Butch
 John Glückstadt (1975, dir. Ulf Miehe) as Michel
 Familienglück (1975, dir.) as Manfred
  (1975, dir. Bernhard Sinkel, Alf Brustellin) as Laski
 The Sternstein Manor (1976, dir. Hans W. Geißendörfer) as Nepomuk Kleebinder aka Muckerl
  (1976, dir. Reinhard Hauff) as Charly
  (1976, dir. Nikos Perakis) as Hänschen "Paganini" Wurlitzer
 Grete Minde (1977, dir. Heidi Genée) as Gerd Minde
 SOKO 5113 (1978–2014, TV Series, 11 episodes) as Kriminalhauptmeister Neubert / Hermann Heindl
 Paul kommt zurück (1978, dir. ) as Kalle
 Der harte Handel (1978, dir. Uli Edel) as Sepp Lederer
 The Man in the Rushes (1978, dir. Manfred Purzer) as Tramp
 The Tailor from Ulm (1978, dir. Edgar Reitz) as Albrecht Berblinger
  (1979, dir. ) as Albert Rais
 The Hamburg Syndrome (1979, dir. Peter Fleischmann) as Fritz
 The Willi Busch Report (1979, dir. Niklaus Schilling) as Willi Busch
 Die Kinder aus Nr. 67 (1980) as Herr Brackmann
  (1981, TV Movie, dir. ) as Heinrich Schliemann
 The Magic Mountain (1982, dir. Hans W. Geißendörfer) as Lehrer Popow
  (1983, dir. Ottokar Runze) as Fred
  (1983, dir. Rolf Silber) as Herr Bauermann
  (1984, TV Movie, dir. Peter Adam) as Fred
  (1984, dir. Reinhard Schwabenitzky) as Bazille
 The NeverEnding Story (1984, dir. Wolfgang Petersen) as Schwienhund. 
  (1984, dir. ) as Theo Schuster
  (1984)
  (1987) as Von Knörringen
 Freckled Max and the Spooks (1987) as Sepp
 Herz mit Löffel (1987)
 Wallers letzter Gang (1989) as Paul Schönfaerber
 Hab' ich nur deine Liebe (1989) as Michael Seebisch
 Verfolgte Wege (1989) as Heindl
  (1992, dir. Niklaus Schilling) as Willi Busch
  (1993) as Teacher
 Adelheid und ihre Mörder (1993–2000, TV Series, 26 episodes) as Kriminalhauptmeister Gernot Schubert
 'El Chicko' – der Verdacht (1996) as Pauls father
 Alle für die Mafia (1998) as Sepp
 Pinky und der Millionenmops (2001) as Punk
 Goebbels und Geduldig (2001) as Heinrich Hoffmann
 Tatort (2001–2008, TV Series, 15 episodes) as Kriminaloberkommissar Eduard Holicek
 Kommissarin Lucas (2003–2019, TV Series, 29 episodes) as Max Kirchhoff
 Die Stunde der Offiziere (2004) as Friedrich Olbricht
  (2005) as Fritz
 5 vor 12 (2006) as Geldeintreiber #1
 Doppelspiel (2006) as Louis Seyfer
 The Counterfeiters (2007) as Hahn
 SEK Calw (2007)
 Mein Freund aus Faro (2008) as Willi Wandel
 Totgesagte leben länger (2008) as Psychiater
  (2008) as Schreiner Christof
  (2009) as Wirt Landgasthof
 Village People 2 – Auf der Jagd nach dem Nazigold (2009) as Adolf Hitler
 Village People – Voll Porno (2011) as Pornoproduzent
 Anduni – Fremde Heimat (2011) as Onkel
  (2011, TV Movie) as Holger Thiessen
 Iron Sky (2012) as Doktor Richter
  (2012) as Schlepper
 Little Thirteen (2012) as Holger Schreiber
 Tatort Calw – Hexensabbat (2013) as Dr. Franz Bäuerle
 Windstorm (2013) as Herr Kaan
 Tatort Calw – So ein Theater! (2014) as Attentäter
 Nebenwege (2014) as Ferdl
 Coming In (2014) as Erich
 Herzlos (2014) as Obdachloser
 Head Full of Honey (2014) as Dr. Ehlers
 Ostwind 2 (2015) as Herr Kaan
  (2015) as Jakob's Father
  (2015–2020, TV Series, 56 episodes) as Kriminaloberkommissar Edwin Bremer
 Ostwind 3: Aufbruch nach Ora (2017) as Herr Kaan
 Village People – Tod aus dem All (2018) as Dr. Bretschneider
 Ostwind: Aris Ankunft (2019) as Herr Kaan
 Mordkommission Calw – Schattenkrieger (2019) as Dr. Neufeld

Awards

 1976 – German Actors Award (Deutscher Darstellerpreis)
 1980 – Reader Jury Award

Books

References

External links

1940 births
2020 deaths
Actors from Augsburg
German male film actors
German male television actors
20th-century German male actors
21st-century German male actors